The 1996 Tennessee Volunteers football team represented the University of Tennessee in the 1996 NCAA Division I-A football season.  The offense scored 437 points and the defense allowed only 185 points. Quarterback Peyton Manning was in his junior year and head coach Phillip Fulmer was in his fifth year. This was the first season that Tennessee had ever lost to the cross-state University of Memphis Tigers.

Schedule

Roster

Team players drafted into the NFL

Awards and honors

References

Tennessee
Tennessee Volunteers football seasons
Citrus Bowl champion seasons
Tennessee Volunteers football